English synth-pop duo Hurts have released five studio albums, one extended play, 23 singles (including one as a featured artist), one promotional single and 23 music videos. Originally formed as the Daggers, the band eventually reformed and changed their name to Hurts prior to being signed to Major Label and RCA Records in July 2009.

Studio albums

Extended plays

Singles

As lead artist

As featured artist

Promotional singles

Other charted songs

Guest appearances

Music videos

Notes

References

External links
 
 
 
 

Discographies of British artists
Electronic music discographies
Pop music group discographies